Byzantine Musical Symbols is a Unicode block containing characters for representing  musical notation for Byzantine music.

Block

History
The following Unicode-related documents record the purpose and process of defining specific characters in the Byzantine Musical Symbols block:

See also 
Byzantine music
Musical Symbols (Unicode block)
Ancient Greek Musical Notation (Unicode block)
Znamenny Musical Notation (Unicode block)

References

Notes and manuals 
 

Unicode blocks
Byzantine music